Azhagan Azhagi (sometimes Alagan Alagi) is a 2012 Indian Tamil-language romantic drama film directed by Nandha Periyasamy and starring Jack (who starred in Mohabbath) and Aarushi.

Cast 
Jack as Selva
Aarushi as Jothi
A. Venkatesh as Rathinavel 
Aarthi as Rani
Ravi Mariya
G. M. Kumar
Chaams
Robo Shankar as Alasunder
Kasthuri in a special appearance

Production 
The film stars 32 debutantes. The film was shot in Chennai, Karaikudi and Ramanathapuram. Power Star appeared in a promotional song.

Soundtrack 
Music by Kannan.
"Nenjil Ninaipathu Ellam" written by Na. Muthukumar and sung by Naresh Iyer and Shweta Mohan
"Mazhai Thuliya Nee" written by Kabilan and sung by Vijay Prakash
"Ethu Varai Vanam" written by Kabilan and sung by Suchitra and Priya
"Adada Azhaga" written by Snehan and sung by Chinnaponnu
"Usilampatti" written by Kabilan and sung by Solar Sai and Priya
"Penne Penne" written by Nanda Periyasamy, Karunanidhi, Raghu and Ravicharan and sung by Benny Dayal
"Oh Girl" written and sung by Richard

Reception 
A critic from The Times of India opined that "Despite the predictable storyline, Alagan Alagi could have at least been bearable if the presentation had been engaging". Malini Mannath of The New Indian Express wrote that "A caravan ride to audition people for a TV show, Alagan Alagi has more to it". A critic from Behindwoods said that "In the end Azhagan Azhagi seemed like it had its moment of inspiration but then decided to borrow the rest from the existing volumes of Tamil cinema". A critic from Indiaglitz wrote that "His [Periyasamy's] story lacks strength and his screen play has no sense of direction".

References

External links 

2013 films
2010s Tamil-language films